Nocardioides daejeonensis is a gram-positive, denitrifying, rod-shaped, aerobic and non-motile bacterium from the genus Nocardioides that has been isolated from a sewage disposal plant in Daejeon, South Korea.

References

External links
Type strain of Nocardioides daejeonensis at BacDive -  the Bacterial Diversity Metadatabase	

daejeonensis
Bacteria described in 2012